Dam Dim (also referred to as Damdimhat) is a village in the Mal CD blocks in the Malbazar subdivision of the Jalpaiguri district, West Bengal, India. It is famous for tea gardens and moist deciduous forests. Dam Dim is specially renowned for drama. Dam Dim has its own drama group, Damdim Yuba Natya Sangstha.

Geography

Location

Area overview
Gorumara National Park has overtaken traditionally popular Jaldapara National Park in footfall and Malbazar has emerged as one of the most important towns in the Dooars. Malbazar subdivision is presented in the map alongside. It is a predominantly rural area with 88.62% of the population living in rural areas and 11.32% living in the urban areas. Tea gardens in the Dooars and Terai regions produce 226 million kg or over a quarter of India's total tea crop.  Some tea gardens were identified in the 2011 census as census towns or villages. Such places are marked in the map as CT (census town) or R (rural/ urban centre). Specific tea estate pages are marked TE.

Note: The map alongside presents some of the notable locations in the subdivision. All places marked in the map are linked in the larger full screen map.

Climate
The major seasons observed in this area are Winter, Spring, Summer and Rainy.
The weather of the place remains pleasant throughout the year. Temperature hardly goes beyond 30o Celsius in summers which lasts only for 2 – 3 months.
Average rainfall is 400 cm. Winters get quite chilly but temperature never drops below freezing point during nights.

Demographics
As per the 2011 Census of India, Damdimhat had a total population of 3,190.  There were 1,625 (51%) males and 1,565 (49%) females. There were 343 persons in the age range of 0 to 6 years. The total number of literate people in Damdimhat was 2,408 (84.58% of the population over 6 years).

Transport
Damdim Railway Station lies on the New Jalpaiguri-Alipurduar-Samuktala Road line.

References

External links
 About Dam Dim
 Satellite map of Dam Dim

Villages in Jalpaiguri district